Coleophora crinita is a moth of the family Coleophoridae. It is found in the United States, including Utah.

References

crinita
Moths described in 1921
Moths of North America